Kachemak Bay National Estuarine Research Reserve, on the western coast of the Kenai Peninsula in Alaska, is part of the National Estuarine Research Reserve System and is managed jointly by the U.S. National Oceanic and Atmospheric Administration and the Alaska Department of Fish and Game. The local community pursued the designation of Kachemak Bay as a National Estuarine Research Reserve to preserve the lifestyle and economy of the region.

The boundary for Kachemak Bay NERR encompasses two State CHAs (Kachemak Bay Critical Habitat Area and Fox River Flats Critical Habitat Area), and two State Parks, (Kachemak Bay State Park and Kachemak Bay State Wilderness Park). The State CHAs comprise 923 km2 (233,650 ac.) within the Reserve boundary [Kachemak Bay = 926 km2 (226,400 ac.); Fox River Flats = 27 km2 (7,200 ac.)], while those areas of Kachemak Bay State Park, Alaska’s first state park, and Kachemak Bay State Wilderness Park, that fall within the Kachemak Bay watershed make up the remaining 554 km2 (138,350 ac.).

References

Protected areas of Kenai Peninsula Borough, Alaska
Protected areas of Alaska
National Estuarine Research Reserves of the United States
Estuaries of Alaska
Bodies of water of Kenai Peninsula Borough, Alaska